Edwin Torres (born 29 December 1946) is a former Puerto Rican cyclist. He competed in the sprint and the 1000m time trial at the 1968 Summer Olympics.

References

External links
 

1946 births
Living people
Puerto Rican male cyclists
Olympic cyclists of Puerto Rico
Cyclists at the 1968 Summer Olympics
People from Humacao, Puerto Rico